Travis County is located in south central Texas. As of the 2020 census, the population was 1,290,188. It is the fifth-most populous county in Texas. Its county seat is Austin, the capital of Texas. The county was established in 1840 and is named in honor of William Barret Travis, the commander of the Republic of Texas forces at the Battle of the Alamo. Travis County is part of the Austin–Round Rock–Georgetown Metropolitan Statistical Area. It is located along the Balcones Fault, the boundary between the Edwards Plateau to the west and the Blackland Prairie to the east.

History

Pre-Columbian and colonial periods

Evidence of habitation of the Balcones Escarpment region of Texas can be traced to at least 11,000 years ago. Two of the oldest Paleolithic archeological sites in Texas, the Levi Rock Shelter and Smith Rock Shelter, are in southwest and southeast Travis County, respectively. Several hundred years before European settlers arrived, a variety of nomadic Native American tribes inhabited the area. These indigenous peoples fished and hunted along the creeks, including present-day Barton Springs, which proved to be a reliable campsite. At the time of the first permanent settlement of the area, the Tonkawa tribe was the most common, with the Comanches and Lipan Apaches also frequenting the area.

The region (along with all of modern Texas) was claimed by the Spanish Empire in the 1600s, but at the time no attempt was made to settle the area (or even to fully explore it). In 1691 Domingo Terán de los Ríos made an inspection tour through East Texas that likely took him through Travis Country. The first European settlers in the area were a group of Spanish friars who arrived from East Texas in July 1730. They established three temporary missions, La Purísima Concepción, San Francisco de los Neches and San José de los Nazonis, on a site by the Colorado River near Barton Springs. The friars found conditions undesirable and relocated to the San Antonio River within a year of their arrival.

Mexican period

In 1821 Mexico won its independence from Spain, and the new government enacted laws encouraging colonists to settle the Texas frontier by granting them land and reduced taxation. Over the next decade, thousands of foreign immigrants (primarily from the United States) moved into Texas; in particular, American empresario Stephen F. Austin established one of his colonies near what is now Bastrop, Texas (in future Travis County) in 1827. Josiah and Mathias Wilbarger, Reuben Hornsby, Jacob M. Harrell, and John F. Webber were early settlers who moved into the area in the early 1830s.

Republican period

In 1836 Texas declared and won its independence from Mexico, forming a new Republic of Texas. After Texas Vice President Mirabeau B. Lamar visited central Texas during a buffalo-hunting expedition between 1837 and 1838, he proposed that the republic's capital (then located in Houston) be relocated to a site on the north bank of the Colorado River. In 1839 the site was officially chosen as the republic's new capital and given the name Waterloo, Texas; shortly thereafter the city's name was changed to Austin in honor of Stephen F. Austin. A new county was also established the following year, of which Austin would be the seat; the county was named Travis County, after William B. Travis. Though the Republic's capital moved briefly back to Houston during the events surrounding the Texas Archive War, by 1845 Austin was again the capital, and it became the capital of the new State of Texas when Texas was annexed by the United States later that year.

Civil War and beyond

In 1861 Travis County was one of the few Texas counties to vote against secession from the Union. Since the majority of the state did favor secession, Travis County then became a part of the Confederacy for the duration of the Civil War. After the Confederacy's defeat, Texas was fully readmitted to the Union in 1870.

From the end of the Civil War to the early twenty-first century, Travis County has experienced steady, rapid population growth (averaging more than a 36% increase every decade from 1870 to 2010), driven largely by the growth of Austin and its suburbs; it is now the fifth most populous county in Texas, after Harris (Houston), Dallas, Tarrant (Fort Worth) and Bexar (San Antonio) counties.

Geography

Travis County is located in the southern part of central Texas, between San Antonio and Dallas–Fort Worth. The county's geographical center lies two miles northwest of downtown Austin at 30°18' north latitude and 97°45' west longitude.

Travis County straddles the Balcones Fault, the boundary between the Edwards Plateau to the west and the Texas Coastal Plain to the east. The western part of the county is characterized by the karst topography of the Texas Hill Country, while the eastern part exhibits the fertile plains and farmlands of the Blackland Prairie. The Colorado River meanders through the county from west to east, forming a series of man-made lakes (Lake Travis, Lake Austin, and Lady Bird Lake).

Springs

The limestone karst geology of the western and southwestern parts of Travis County gives rise to numerous caverns and springs, some of which have provided shelter and water for humans in the region for thousands of years. Notable springs in the county include Barton Springs, Deep Eddy and Hamilton Pool.

Major highways
Travis County is crossed by Interstate Highway 35, US Highways 183 and 290, and Texas Highway 71. IH-35 leads northward to Waco and Dallas–Fort Worth and southward to San Antonio. US-183 leads northward through Cedar Park to Lampasas and southward to Lockhart. US-290 leads westward to Fredericksburg and eastward to Houston. TX-71 leads westward to Marble Falls and eastward to Bastrop.

Other major highways within the county include Texas Highway Loop 1 (the "Mopac Expressway"), which runs from north to south through the center of the county, and Texas Highway 45, which forms parts of an incomplete highway loop around Austin. Texas Highway 130 (constructed as an alternative to IH-35 for long-distance traffic wishing to avoid Austin and San Antonio) also runs from north to south through the sparsely populated eastern part of the county.

Adjacent counties
 Williamson County (north)
 Bastrop County (east)
 Caldwell County (south)
 Hays County (southwest)
 Blanco County (west)
 Burnet County (northwest)

Protected areas
 Balcones Canyonlands National Wildlife Refuge (part)

Demographics

Note: the US Census treats Hispanic/Latino as an ethnic category. This table excludes Latinos from the racial categories and assigns them to a separate category. Hispanics/Latinos can be of any race.

According to the census of 2010, there were 1,024,266 people, 320,766 households, and 183,798 families residing in the county. The population density was 1034 persons per square mile (387/km2). There were 335,881 housing units at an average density of 340 per square mile (131/km2). The racial makeup of the county was 68.21% White, 9.26% Black or African American, 0.58% Native American, 4.47% Asian, 0.07% Pacific Islander, 14.56% other races, and 2.85% from two or more races. 28.20% of the population were Hispanic or Latino of any race. English is the sole language spoken at home by 71.42% of the population age 5 or over, while 22.35% speak Spanish, and a Chinese language (including Mandarin, Taiwanese, and Cantonese) is spoken by 1.05%. As of the 2010 census, there were about 11.1 same-sex couples per 1,000 households in the county.

According to the census of 2000, there were 812,280 people, of which 29.30% had children under the age of 18 living with them, 42.60% were married couples living together, 10.40% had a female householder with no husband present, and 42.70% were non-families. 30.10% of all households were composed of individuals, and 4.40% had someone living alone who was 65 or older. The average household size was 2.47 and the average family size was 3.15. 12.0% were of German, 7.7% English, 6.6% Irish and 5.5% American ancestry according to Census 2000

The population's age distribution was 23.80% under the age of 18, 14.70% from 18 to 24, 36.50% from 25 to 44, 18.20% from 45 to 64, and 6.70% age 65 years of age or older. The median age was 30 years. For every 100 females, there were 104.90 males. For every 100 females age 18 and over, there were 104.50 males.

Government and infrastructure

Like other Texas counties, Travis County is governed by a Commissioners' Court composed of the county judge and four county commissioners. The court levies county taxes and sets the budgets for county officials and agencies. The judge and commissioners are elected for four-year terms (the judge at-large, and the commissioners from geographic precincts). The other major county-wide official is the county clerk, who maintains the county's records, administers elections, and oversees legal documentation (such as property deeds, marriage licenses and assumed name certificates). The clerk is also elected at-large for a four-year term.

The Heman Marion Sweatt Travis County Courthouse is located in downtown Austin. The county courthouse holds civil and criminal trial courts and other functions of county government. , the county's probate courts are in the process of being moved from the county courthouse into Austin's 1936 United States Courthouse, which was acquired by the county in 2016.

Corrections
The Travis County Jail and the Travis County Criminal Justice Center are located in Downtown Austin. The Travis County Correctional Complex is located in an unincorporated area in Travis County, next to Austin-Bergstrom International Airport.

The Texas Department of Criminal Justice operates the Travis County State Jail, a state jail for men, in eastern Austin.

Economy

As of 2017, Travis County had a median household income of $68,350 per year, and a per capita income of $38,820 per year. 13.9% of the population lived below the poverty level. The county's largest employers are governments (the State of Texas, the US Federal Government, Travis County and the City of Austin) and public education bodies. Other major employers are concentrated in industries relating to semiconductors, software engineering and healthcare.

Travis County, along with other Texas counties, has one of the nation's highest property tax rates. In 2009, the county was ranked 88th in the nation for property taxes as percentage of the homes value on owner-occupied housing. Travis County also ranked in the top 100 for amount of property taxes paid and for percentage of income paid as tax. Property tax rates are generally high in Texas because the state does not levy an income tax.

Education

K-12 education
Travis County is served by a number of public school districts; the largest is Austin Independent School District, serving most of Austin. Other districts wholly or mainly located in Travis County include Eanes ISD, Lake Travis ISD, Lago Vista ISD, Leander ISD, Del Valle ISD, Manor ISD, and Pflugerville ISD. Parts of Elgin ISD, Coupland ISD, Hutto ISD, Round Rock ISD, Marble Falls ISD, Johnson City ISD, Dripping Springs ISD and Hays Consolidated ISD also cross into Travis County.

State-operated schools include:
 Texas School for the Blind and Visually Impaired
 Texas School for the Deaf
Texas Blind, Deaf, and Orphan School was formerly in operation for black students pre-desegregation.

Colleges and universities
The largest university in Travis County is the University of Texas at Austin. Other universities include St. Edward's University, Huston–Tillotson University, and Concordia University Texas.

Under Texas law Austin Community College District (ACC) is the designated community college for most of the county. However areas in Marble Falls ISD are zoned to Central Texas College District.

Healthcare
Central Health, a hospital district, was established in 2004. Brackenridge Hospital was originally built as the City-County Hospital in 1884 but Travis County ended its share of the ownership in 1907. In 2017 Brackenridge was replaced by the Dell Seton Medical Center.

Politics
Travis County is one of the most consistently Democratic counties in Texas, having voted for the Democratic presidential nominee in twelve of the last fifteen elections since 1960. The only exceptions have been the Republican landslide years of 1972 and 1984, when Richard Nixon and Ronald Reagan each won 49 out of 50 states, and 2000, when the Republican nominee was incumbent Texas Governor George W. Bush. In 2005 Travis County was the only county in Texas to vote against the Proposition 2 state constitutional amendment banning gay marriage, with slightly under 60% of voters being against it. In 2020, Travis County backed Democrat Joe Biden with nearly 72% of the vote, which was the highest percentage he received in any Texas county, and the largest percentage received by any winner of the presidential election in the county since 1948.

The county's Democratic advantage is not limited to the presidential level, as all of the county-level officials and state representatives are Democrats.

County government

Travis County elected officials

Communities

Cities (multiple counties)
 Austin (county seat) (small parts in Hays and Williamson counties)
 Cedar Park (mostly in Williamson County)
 Elgin (mostly in Bastrop County)
 Leander (mostly in Williamson County)
 Mustang Ridge (small parts in Caldwell and Bastrop counties)
 Pflugerville (small part in Williamson County)
 Round Rock (mostly in Williamson County)

Cities

 Bee Cave
 Creedmoor
 Jonestown
 Lago Vista
 Lakeway
 Manor
 Rollingwood
 Sunset Valley
 West Lake Hills

Villages

 Briarcliff
 Point Venture
 San Leanna
 The Hills
 Volente
 Webberville

Census-designated places

 Anderson Mill (former)
 Barton Creek
 Garfield
 Hornsby Bend
 Hudson Bend
 Jollyville (former)
 Lost Creek
 Manchaca
 Onion Creek (former)
 Shady Hollow
 Steiner Ranch
 Tanglewood Forest (former)
 Wells Branch
 Windemere (former)

Unincorporated communities

 Bluff Springs
 Cele
 Del Valle
 Elroy
 Kimbro
 Littig
 Lund
 Marshall Ford
 McNeil
 Nameless
 New Sweden
 Pilot Knob

See also

 Austin Bat Cave (non-profit educational org)
 List of museums in Central Texas
 National Register of Historic Places listings in Travis County, Texas
 Recorded Texas Historic Landmarks in Travis County

References

External links
 Travis County Government website
 
 

 
1840 establishments in the Republic of Texas
Populated places established in 1840
Greater Austin
Texas Hill Country
Majority-minority counties in Texas